The 2017 West Dunbartonshire Council election was held on Thursday 4 May 2017, on the same day as the 31 other local authorities in Scotland. The election used the six wards created under the Local Governance (Scotland) Act 2004, with 22 Councillors being elected. Each ward will elect either 3 or 4 members, using the STV electoral system.

Following the 2012 election a Labour majority administration was formed. After this election, the SNP group and Councillor Denis Agnew formed a minority coalition administration, led by the SNP leader, Jonathan McColl. As part of the deal, the title of bailie was revived, and Councillor Agnew was appointed as West Dunbartonshire's first. The 2017 election marked the first time that Conservatives were elected to the Council in its history.

2017 Results

Note: "Votes" are the first preference votes. The net gain/loss and percentage changes relate to the result of the previous Scottish local elections on 3 May 2012. This may differ from other published sources showing gain/loss relative to seats held at dissolution of Scotland's councils.

Ward results

Lomond
2012: 2xLab; 1xSNP
2017: 1xSNP; 1xLab; 1xCon
2012-2017 Change: Con gain one seat from Lab

Leven
2012: 2xLab; 1xSNP; 1xSSP
2017: 2xSNP; 1xWDCP; 1xLab
2012-2017 Change: SNP and WDCP gain one each from Lab and SSP

† Michelle McGinty was previously known as Michelle Stewart.

Dumbarton
2012: 2xLab; 1xSNP; 1xIndependent
2017: 2xSNP; 1xLab; 1xCon
2012-2017 Change: SNP and Con gain one each from Lab and Ind

Kilpatrick
2012: 2xLab; 1xSNP  
2017: 2xLab; 1xSNP
2012-2017 Change: No change

Clydebank Central
2012: 2xLab; 1xSNP; 1xIndependent  
2017: 2xSNP; 1xLab; 1xIndependent
2012-2017 Change: SNP gain one from Lab

Clydebank Waterfront
2012: 2xLab; 1xSNP; 1xIndependent
2017: 2xSNP; 2xLab
2012-2017 Change: SNP gain one from Ind

References

External links
2017 Council Candidates

2017
2017 Scottish local elections
21st century in West Dunbartonshire